The 17th season of Law & Order premiered on NBC on September 22, 2006, and concluded on May 18, 2007. This is the last season to feature Fred Thompson (Arthur Branch) the only season to feature Milena Govich and the first season to feature Assistant District Attorney Connie Rubirosa.

Cast changes
Following the departures of Dennis Farina and Annie Parisse at the end of the sixteenth season, Milena Govich and Alana de la Garza joined the cast as Detective Nina Cassady and Assistant District Attorney Connie Rubirosa, respectively. Jesse L. Martin's character (Ed Green) was promoted to senior detective to replace Farina's character. At the end of the season, Fred Thompson (Arthur Branch) and Milena Govich departed the cast. Former cast member Richard Brooks reprised his role as Paul Robinette for the episode "Fear America".

Cast

Main cast
 Jesse L. Martin as Senior Detective Ed Green
 Milena Govich as Junior Detective Nina Cassady
 S. Epatha Merkerson as Lieutenant Anita Van Buren
 Sam Waterston as Executive Assistant District Attorney Jack McCoy
 Alana de la Garza as Assistant District Attorney Connie Rubirosa
 Fred Dalton Thompson as District Attorney Arthur Branch

Recurring cast
 Richard Brooks as Defense Attorney Paul Robinette
 Carolyn McCormick as Dr. Elizabeth Olivet

Episodes

References

External links
 Episode guide from NBC.com

17
2006 American television seasons
2007 American television seasons